Belleview Township is an inactive township in Washington County, in the U.S. state of Missouri.

Belleview Township was first called "Bellevue Township", and under the latter name was erected in the 1810s.

References

Townships in Missouri
Townships in Washington County, Missouri